Grupo Aeroportuario Centro Norte, S.A.B. de C.V., known as OMA, is a Mexican airport operator headquartered in San Pedro, near Monterrey, Mexico. It operates 13 airports in the central and northern states of Mexico, including that of Monterrey, one of Mexico's largest cities. It is the fourth largest airport services company by passenger traffic in Mexico. It serves approximately 15 million passengers annually.

OMA is listed  on the Mexican Stock Exchange and in the NASDAQ through ADRs since 2006. In June 2015, OMA announced it had engaged UBS as market maker to promote the liquidity and trading volume for the shares listed in the Mexican Stock Exchange.

Operating airports

Passenger numbers
Number of passengers at each airport by 2021:

OMA statistics
Annual sum of passengers from OMA airports.

References

External links

Official Website

Companies listed on the Nasdaq
Airport operators of Mexico
Airports in Mexico
Aviation in Mexico
Companies listed on the Mexican Stock Exchange